SH3 and multiple ankyrin repeat domains protein 2 is a protein that in humans is encoded by the SHANK2 gene. Two alternative splice variants, encoding distinct isoforms, are reported. Additional splice variants exist but their full-length nature has not been determined.

Function 

This gene encodes a protein that is a member of the Shank family of synaptic proteins that may function as molecular scaffolds in the postsynaptic density (PSD). Shank proteins contain multiple domains for protein-protein interaction, including ankyrin repeats, an SH3 domain, a PSD-95/Dlg/ZO-1 domain, a sterile alpha motif domain, and a proline-rich region. This particular family member contains a PDZ domain, a consensus sequence for cortactin SH3 domain-binding peptides and a sterile alpha motif. The alternative splicing demonstrated in Shank genes has been suggested as a mechanism for regulating the molecular structure of Shank and the spectrum of Shank-interacting proteins in the PSDs of adult and developing brain.

It is thought that SHANK2 might play a role in synaptogenesis by attaching metabotropic glutamate receptors (mGluRs) to an existing pool of NMDA receptors (NMDA-R), bylinking to the NMDA-R through PSD-95, and the mGluRs through HOMER1. An alternative hypothesis is that the Homer/Shank/GKAP/PSD-95 assembly mediates physical association of the NMDAR with IP3R/RYR and intracellular Ca2+ stores.

Interactions 

SHANK2 has been shown to interact with:
 ARHGEF7,
 Cortactin,
 DLG4,
 DLGAP1, and
 DNM2.

Associations with neuropsychiatric disease 
Mutations in SHANK2 have been associated with autism spectrum disorder (ASD) and schizophrenia. In particular, heterozygous loss-of-function mutations have a near-complete penetrance in ASD. Neurons generated from people with ASD and SHANK2 mutations develop larger dendritic trees and more synaptic connections than those from healthy controls. In addition, common mutations in SHANK2 have been linked to bipolar disorder.

References

Further reading

External Links  

 The SHANK2 Foundation - non-profit supporting families and research into SHANK2 disorders